Valitovo (Wälit) is a rural locality (a village) in Tselinny Selsoviet, Khaybullinsky District, Bashkortostan, Russia. The population was 268 as of 2010. There are 4 streets.

Geography 
Valitovo is located 47 km north of Akyar (the district's administrative centre) by road. Komsomolsk is the nearest rural locality.

References 

Rural localities in Khaybullinsky District